Kodeljevo Sports Park is a multi-purpose stadium in Ljubljana, Slovenia. It is currently used mostly for football matches and is the home ground of ND Slovan. The stadium opened in 1959 and the main stand was built in 1965.

It is located in a larger sports complex, which includes a multi-purpose arena, an Olympic swimming pool and tennis courts.

References

External links
Kodeljevo Sports Park on stadioni.org

Football venues in Slovenia
Multi-purpose stadiums in Slovenia
Sports venues in Ljubljana
Buildings and structures completed in 1965
Moste District
1965 establishments in Slovenia
20th-century architecture in Slovenia